Northwest Cove is a cove on the St. Margarets Bay, Nova Scotia, Canada, and the community on Aspotogan Peninsula that surrounds it.

Administratively Northwest Cove is a General Service Area of the Chester Municipal District, and as such includes the areas also known as Southwest Cove and Coleman's Cove.

Northwest Cove is on the Lighthouse Route (Nova Scotia Route 329).

Several scenes from the television show Haven were shot in the Cove.

References

External links
 Northwest Cove on Destination Nova Scotia

Communities in Lunenburg County, Nova Scotia
General Service Areas in Nova Scotia